Toledo City is politically subdivided into 38 barangays.

The city is part of the 3rd legislative district of the Province of Cebu.

As of 2015, 12 barangays are classified as urban barangays where 90,114 (52.90%) of Toledo City's population lives, while the remaining 26 rural barangays are home to 80,221 residents, representing 47.10% of the total population.

Poblacion is the most populous barangay in the city with a population of 13,383 while Sagay is the least populous barangay with only 1,145 residents. Biga recorded a 60.26% increase in population, the highest in the city while Sagay decreased 28.66% in terms of population.

List of Barangays

References

External links
 The 38 Barangays Of Toledo City - Official Website of Toledo City Government

Toledo, Cebu